Jarmila Novotná (September 23, 1907 in Prague – February 9, 1994 in New York City) was a Czech soprano and actress. From 1940 to 1956, she was a star of the Metropolitan Opera.

Early career
A student of Emmy Destinn, Novotná made her operatic debut at the National Theatre in Prague, on June 28, 1925, as Mařenka in Smetana's The Bartered Bride. Six days later, she sang there as Violetta in Verdi's La traviata. In 1928 she starred in Verona as Gilda opposite Giacomo Lauri-Volpi in Verdi's Rigoletto and at the Teatro San Carlo in Naples as Adina opposite Tito Schipa in Donizetti's L'elisir d'amore. In 1929 she joined the Kroll Opera in Berlin, where she sang Violetta as well as the title roles of Puccini's Manon Lescaut and Madama Butterfly.

In January 1933 she created the female lead in Jaromir Weinberger's new operetta Frühlingsstürme, opposite Richard Tauber at the Theater im Admiralspalast, Berlin. This was the last new operetta produced in the Weimar Republic, and she and Tauber were both soon forced to leave Germany by the new Nazi regime.

Vienna and New York
In 1934 she left Berlin for Vienna, where she created the title role in Lehár's Giuditta opposite Richard Tauber. Her immense success in that role led to a contract with the Vienna State Opera, where she was named Kammersängerin. Prior to the Anschluss, she also appeared with Tauber there in The Bartered Bride and Madama Butterfly.

She appeared as Pamina in the 1937 Salzburg Festival production of Mozart's The Magic Flute, conducted by Arturo Toscanini. In the orchestra pit was the young Georg Solti, who played the glockenspiel in the opera.

On January 5, 1940 she made her debut with the Metropolitan Opera, as Mimì in Puccini's La bohème. She also appeared in twelve other roles at the Met: Euridice, Violetta, Cherubino, Massenet's Manon, Marenka, Donna Elvira, Pamina, Octavian, Antonia, Freia, Mélisande and Prince Orlofsky, the role in which she made her farewell performance on January 15, 1956. Of her 208 appearances at the Met, 103 were in the breeches roles of Prince Orlofsky, Cherubino and Octavian.

Films
She appeared in several films, including Max Ophüls's 1932 version of The Bartered Bride. In 1948 she won acclaim for her leading role as an Auschwitz survivor who searches for her young son, played by Ivan Jandl, in The Search which co-starred Montgomery Clift. In 1951, she appeared in The Great Caruso, starring Mario Lanza.

Honours
Liteň Castle, where Novotná lived with her husband Jiří Daubek, hosts a music festival every year, which is named Festival of Jarmila Novotná in her honour.

Filmography
 Vyznavači slunce (1926) as Countess Jacinta
 Fire in the Opera House (1930) as Die Primadonna
 The Beggar Student (1931) as Laura
 The Bartered Bride (1932) as Marie
 Die Nacht der großen Liebe (1933) as Frau Thormaelen
 Skřivánčí píseň (1933) as Maja Zemanova
 Frasquita (1934) as Frasquita
 The Cossack and the Nightingale (1935) as Vera Starschenska
 The Last Waltz (French version, 1936) as Countess Vera Lizavetta
 The Last Waltz (English version, 1936) as La comtesse Véra-Élisabétha Opalinsky
 The Search (1948) as Mrs. Hanna Malik
 The Great Caruso (1951) as Maria Selka

Bibliography
 The Last Prima Donnas, by Lanfranco Rasponi, Alfred A Knopf, 1982.

References

External links

 
 
 
 
 
MetOpera database
Photographs and literature
Jarmila Novotná interview, March 26, 1988
 Jarmila Novotná - Weißt Du nicht, was, aus Frasquita von Franz Lehar

1907 births
1994 deaths
Musicians from Prague
Czech expatriates in the United States
Czech operatic sopranos
Recipients of the Order of Tomáš Garrigue Masaryk
20th-century Czech women opera singers
Czechoslovak women opera singers